This is a list of films with two or more Academy Awards in an acting category.

The Academy of Motion Picture Arts and Sciences annually presents Academy Awards for acting performances in the following four categories: Best Actor, Best Actress, Best Supporting Actor, and Best Supporting Actress.

As of the 95th Academy Awards (2022), 40 films have won at least two acting awards.  Of these, three films  A Streetcar Named Desire (1951),  Network (1976), and Everything Everywhere All at Once (2022)  have won three acting awards.  To date, no film has won four Academy Awards in an acting category.

Four acting awards 

To date, no film has won four (or more) Academy Awards in acting categories.

However, there have been fifteen films containing at least one nominated performance in each of the four Academy Award acting categories.

Three acting awards 

 Notes

 Marlon Brando was nominated for Best Actor for A Streetcar Named Desire.  However, he lost to Humphrey Bogart, who won for The African Queen.
 Ned Beatty was nominated for Best Supporting Actor for Network.  However, he lost to Jason Robards, who won for All the President's Men.
 William Holden was also nominated for Best Actor for Network, losing to his costar Finch.
 Stephanie Hsu was also nominated for Best Supporting Actress for Everything Everywhere All at Once, losing to her costar Curtis. 
 Everything Everywhere All at Once is the only film to win three acting Oscars as well as the Academy Award for Best Picture.

Best Actor and Best Actress

Best Actor and Best Supporting Actor

Best Actor and Best Supporting Actress

Best Actress and Best Supporting Actor

Best Actress and Best Supporting Actress

Best Supporting Actor and Best Supporting Actress

Superlatives 

There are six possible combinations by which a film can win two Academy Awards for acting.

 The first film to win two acting awards was It Happened One Night (1934), which won Best Actor and Best Actress at the 7th Academy Awards.
 The most recent film to win at least two acting awards was Everything Everywhere All at Once (2022), which won Best Actress, Best Supporting Actor, and Best Supporting Actress at the 95th Academy Awards.
 The combination that has occurred most often is Best Actress and Best Supporting Actress (eleven films).
 The combination that has occurred least often is Best Actor and Best Supporting Actor (five films).
 The combination that occurred the longest time ago is Best Actor and Best Supporting Actress, with My Left Foot (1989) winning both at the 62nd Academy Awards.
 The combination with the longest gap between awards is Best Actor and Best Supporting Actor, which occurred 44 years apart: in 1959 at the 32nd Academy Awards and again in 2003 at the 76th Academy Awards.
 The Miracle Worker (1962) and  Hud (1963) are the only films to win two or more acting Oscars without getting nominated for the Academy Award for Best Picture

See also 

 List of Big Five Academy Award winners and nominees
 List of films with all four Academy Award acting nominations
 List of movies with more than one Academy Award nomination in the same category

References 

Academy Award